Lawrence Mark Dundas, 4th Marquess of Zetland,  (born 28 December 1937), less formally known as Mark Zetland, is a British peer, known before 1989 as Earl of Ronaldshay.

Education and career

He was educated at Harrow School and Christ's College, Cambridge, before joining the Grenadier Guards.

Later in his life, Lord Zetland was appointed as the Deputy Lieutenant (DL) of the County of North Yorkshire on 6 May 1994. On 28 December 2012 He was moved to the retired list upon reaching the Mandatory retirement age of 75. Lord Zetland has also appeared as a contestant on the 4 August 1959 episode of To Tell the Truth. He currently resides at Aske Hall.

Family
He is the son of Lawrence Aldred Mervyn Dundas, 3rd Marquess of Zetland and Penelope Pike. 
He married Susan Chamberlin on 4 April 1964; they have four children.

He is the elder brother of rock musician David Dundas.

Arms

References

  

1937 births
People educated at Harrow School
Alumni of Christ's College, Cambridge
Deputy Lieutenants of North Yorkshire
Living people
Marquesses of Zetland

Zetland